Taherabad (also Romanized as Ţāherābād) is a village in Hajjilar-e Jonubi Rural District, Hajjilar District, Chaypareh County, West Azerbaijan Province, Iran. At the 2006 census, its population was 226, in 39 families.

References 

Populated places in Chaypareh County